The 2013–14 West Virginia Mountaineers men's basketball team represented West Virginia University during the 2013–14 NCAA Division I men's basketball season. The Mountaineers were coached by seventh year head coach Bob Huggins and played their home games at WVU Coliseum. They finished the season 17–16, 9–9 in Big 12 play to finish in a tie for sixth place. They lost in the quarterfinals of the Big 12 tournament to Texas. They were invited to the National Invitation Tournament where they lost in the first round to Georgetown.

Before the season

Departures

Recruits

In addition to the five high school players signed, coach Bob Huggins also received commitments from Junior College transfers Jonathan Holton (Palm Beach Community College) and Remi Dibo (Casper College), both forwards.

Season

Preseason
Head coach Bob Huggins announced the Mountaineers' full season schedule on August 8, 2013. The Mountaineers would play home dates against opponents such as Gonzaga and Purdue, as well as participating in the annual Cancún Challenge with 2013 NCAA Tournament teams such as Saint Louis and Wisconsin. The Mountaineers also scheduled to visit Virginia Tech and Missouri, with the Missouri game part of the first ever Big 12/SEC Challenge. West Virginia's 18 game conference slate included home and away dates against each of the nine other members of the Big 12 Conference.

Roster

Schedule and results
Sources:  and 

|-
!colspan=9 style="background:#FFC600; color:#003366;"| Exhibition

|-
!colspan=9 style="background:#FFC600; color:#003366;"| Non-conference games

|-
!colspan=9 style="background:#FFC600; color:#003366;"| Conference games

|-
!colspan=9 style="background:#FFC600; color:#003366;"| Big 12 tournament

|-
!colspan=9 style="background:#FFC600; color:#003366;"| NIT

See also
 2013–14 NCAA Division I men's basketball rankings
 2013–14 West Virginia Mountaineers women's basketball team

References

West Virginia
West Virginia Mountaineers men's basketball seasons
West Virginia
Mount
Mount